Ewart John Arlington Harnum (October 13, 1910 – February 29, 1996) was a Canadian businessman and the fifth lieutenant governor of Newfoundland from 1969 to 1974.

Born on Sound Island in Placentia Bay, Newfoundland, Harnum was educated at Bishop Feild College, St. John's. His business background was in insurance, as he worked for Dale and Company Limited, followed by Bowring Insurance, Mutual Life Insurance of Canada and finally W.U. Knowling Insurance Limited. Harnum then established his own business, Harnum Insurance Agencies.

Harnum was very active in the community and served on many boards. Following is a list of his many accomplishments:
President, Newfoundland Board of Insurance Underwriters,
President, Newfoundland Insurance Agents Association,
first President, Insurance Institution of Newfoundland,
Mason, Grand Lodge of Scotland A.F. and A.M.,
District Grand Master, Grand Lodge of Scotland,
honorary Junior Grand Warden, Grand Lodge of Scotland,
Provincial Grand Master, Royal Order of Scotland,
honorary Senior Grand Warden, Royal Order of Scotland,
Knight of Grace, Priory of St. John of Jerusalem,
President, St. John Ambulance,
Doctor of Laws (Honoris Causa), Memorial University of Newfoundland,
Chairman, Canadian Games for the Physically Disabled,
member, St. John's Board of Trade
member, St. Thomas Anglican Church.

See also
List of people of Newfoundland and Labrador

External links
Biography at Government House The Governorship of Newfoundland and Labrador

1910 births
1996 deaths
Lieutenant Governors of Newfoundland and Labrador
Bishop Feild School alumni